Glennville (formerly Linn's Valley) is an unincorporated community in Kern County, California.

Geography

Climate
Glennville has a typically Californian Mediterranean climate (Köppen Csb, bordering on Csa). Summers are hot during the day, with 51.5 afternoons during an average year topping , but mornings remains pleasantly cool and dry.

History
The first white settlers in the area were George Ely and William Linn, who arrived together in 1854. Ely died in 1859 and Linn left the area around the same time. Linn's Valley post office opened in 1860 and the town changed its name to Glennville in 1872. The name honors James Madison Glenn, a blacksmith who settled the area in 1857 and opened the town's first hotel. Glennville became the last stop on the stagecoach line from Visalia and the trading center for the surrounding valley after the decline of Lavers' Crossing. In 1860, a state-funded wagon road from Glennville to Kernville was laid out by Thomas Baker, a civil engineer and founder of Bakersfield. A tribute to his ingenuity is that today's State Route 155 still follows Baker's route, originally known as the McFarlane Road, almost entirely.

Glennville remains a quiet country town with one restaurant and no gas station. The southernmost grove of Giant Sequoia trees, Deer Creek Grove, is located about ten miles northeast of Glennville. The Glennville adobe, built before the Civil War, still stands along Route 155 next to the fire station and is the oldest building in Kern County. The oldest standing church in the county, dating to 1866, stands nearby.

References

External links
http://www.jamesonranchcamp.com/

Unincorporated communities in Kern County, California
Greenhorn Mountains
Populated places in the Sierra Nevada (United States)
Unincorporated communities in California
1854 establishments in California